Awen is a Welsh, Cornish and Breton word for "inspiration" (and typically poetic inspiration).

In Welsh mythology, awen is the inspiration of the poets, or bards; or, in its personification, Awen is the inspirational muse of creative artists in general. The inspired individual (often a poet or a soothsayer) is described as an awenydd.  
Neo-Druids define awen as "flowing energy," or "a force that flows with the essence of life."

In current usage, awen is sometimes ascribed to musicians and poets. It is also used as female given name.

It appears in the third stanza of Hen Wlad fy Nhadau, the national anthem of Wales.

Etymology
Awen derives from the Indo-European root *-uel, meaning 'to blow', and has the same root as the word awel meaning 'breeze' in Welsh and 'wind' or 'gale' in Cornish.

Historical attestation
The first recorded attestation of the word occurs in Nennius' Historia Brittonum, a Latin text of c. 796, based in part on earlier writings by the Welsh monk, Gildas. It occurs in the phrase 'Tunc talhaern tat aguen in poemate claret' (Talhaern the father of the muse was then renowned in poetry) where the Old Welsh word aguen (awen) occurs in the Latin text describing poets from the sixth century.

It is also recorded in its current form in Canu Llywarch Hen (9th or 10th century?) where Llywarch says 'I know by my awen' indicating it as a source of instinctive knowledge.

On connections between awen as poetic inspiration and as an infusion from the divine, The Book of Taliesin often implies this. A particularly striking example is contained in the lines:

ban pan doeth peir
ogyrwen awen teir

-literally “the three elements of inspiration that came, splendid, out of the cauldron” but implicitly “that came from God” as ‘peir’ (cauldron) can also mean ‘sovereign’ often with the meaning ‘God’. It is the “three elements” that is cleverly worked in here as awen was sometimes characterised as consisting of three sub-divisions (‘ogyrwen’) so “the ogyrwen of triune inspiration”, perhaps suggesting the Trinity.

There are fifteen occurrences of the word awen in The Book of Taliesin  as well as several equivalent words or phrases, such as ogyrven which is used both as a division of the awen (‘Seven score ogyrven which are in awen, shaped in Annwfn’) as well as an alternative word for awen itself. The poem Armes Prydain 
(The Prophecies of Britain) begins with the phrase ‘Awen foretells …’, and it is repeated later in the poem. The link between poetic inspiration and divination is implicit in the description of the Awenyddion given by Gerald of Wales in the 12th century and the link between bardic expression and prophecy is a common feature of much early verse in Wales and elsewhere

A poem in The Black Book of Carmarthen by an unidentified bard, but addressed to Cuhelyn Fardd (1100-1130) asks God to allow the awen to flow so that ‘inspired song from Ceridwen will shape diverse and well-crafted verse’. This anticipates much poetry from identified bards of the Welsh princes between circa 1100-1300 which juggles the competing claims of the Celtic Church with the source of the awen in the Cauldron of Ceridwen.

 So Llywarch ap Llywelyn (1173-1220) – also known as ‘Prydydd y Moch’ – can address his patron Llywelyn ap Iorwerth like this:

'I greet my lord, bring awen’s great greeting

Words from Ceridwen I compose

Just like Taliesin when he freed Elffin'.

The same poet also penned the lines

'The Lord God grant me sweet awen

As from the Cauldron of Ceridwen'

Elidr Sais (c. 1195-1246), ‘singing to Christ’, wrote

'Brilliant my poetry after Myrddin

Shining forth from the cauldron of awen'

Dafydd Benfras (1220-1258) included both Myrddin (Merlin) and Aneirin in his backward glance:

'Full of awen as Myrddin desired

Singing praise as Aneirin before me

when he sang of ‘Gododdin’.'

Later in the Middle Ages the identification of the source of the Awen begins to shift from Ceridwen to more orthodox christian sources such as the Virgin Mary, the saints, or directly from God. A full discussion can be found in Awen y Cynfeirdd a’r Gogynfeirdd by Y Chwaer Bosco.  The Bardic Grammars of the later Middle Ages identify ‘The Holy Spirit’ as the proper source of the awen.  The 15th century bard Sion Cent argued that God is the only source and dismissed the “lying awen” of bards who thought otherwise as in his dismissive lines

A claimant false this awen is found

Born of hell’s furnace underground

Such a focus on an unmediated source was picked up by the eighteenth century Unitarian  Iolo Morgannwg (Edward Williams, 1747-1826) who was able to invent the awen symbol /|\, suggesting that it was an ancient druidic sign of “the ineffable name of God, being the rays of the rising sun at the equinoxes and solstices, conveying into focus the eye of light”.

Giraldus Cambrensis referred to those inspired by the awen as "awenyddion" in his  Description of Wales (1194):

THERE are certain persons in Cambria, whom you will find nowhere else, called Awenyddion, or people inspired; when consulted upon any doubtful event, they roar out violently, are rendered beside themselves, and become, as it were, possessed by a spirit. They do not deliver the answer to what is required in a connected manner; but the person who skilfully observes them, will find, after many preambles, and many nugatory and incoherent, though ornamented speeches, the desired explanation conveyed in some turn of a word: they are then roused from their ecstasy, as from a deep sleep, and, as it were, by violence compelled to return to their proper senses. After having answered the questions, they do not recover till violently shaken by other people; nor can they remember the replies they have given. If consulted a second or third time upon the same point, they will make use of expressions totally different; perhaps they speak by the means of fanatic and ignorant spirits. These gifts are usually conferred upon them in dreams: some seem to have sweet milk or honey poured on their lips; others fancy that a written schedule is applied to their mouths and on awaking they publicly declare that they have received this gift.
(Chapter XVI: Concerning the soothsayers of this nation, and persons as it were possessed) 

In 1694, the Welsh poet Henry Vaughan wrote to his cousin, the antiquary John Aubrey, in response to a request for some information about the remnants of Druidry in existence in Wales at that time, saying

Modern Druidic symbol

In some forms of modern Druidism, the term is symbolized by an emblem showing three straight lines that spread apart as they move downward, drawn within a circle or a series of circles of varying thickness, often with a dot, or point, atop each line. The British Druid Order attributes the symbol to Iolo Morganwg; it has been adopted by some Neo-Druids.

According to Jan Morris, Iolo Morganwg did in fact create what is now called "The Awen" as a symbol for the Gorsedd Cymru, the secret society of Welsh poets, writers, and musicians that he claimed to have rediscovered, but in fact created himself. Morganwg, whose own beliefs were, according to Marcus Tanner, beliefs were, "a compound of Christianity and Druidism, Philosophy and Mysticism", explained the Awen symbol as follows, "And God vocalizing His Name said /|\, and with the Word all the world sprang into being, singing in ecstasy of joy /|\ and repeating the name of the Deity."

The Order of Bards, Ovates and Druids (OBOD) describe the three lines as rays emanating from three points of light, with those points representing the triple aspect of deity and, also, the points at which the sun rises on the equinoxes and solstices – known as the Triad of the Sunrises. The emblem as used by the OBOD is surrounded by three circles representing the three circles of creation.

Various modern Druidic groups and individuals have their own interpretation of the awen. The three lines relate to earth, sea and air; body, mind and spirit; or love, wisdom and truth. It is also said that the awen stands for not simply inspiration, but for inspiration of truth; without awen one cannot proclaim truth. The three foundations of awen are the understanding of truth, the love of truth, and the maintaining of truth.

A version of the awen was approved by the United States Department of Veterans Affairs in early 2017 as an emblem for veteran headstones.

See also
Muse
Óðr
Vates
Welsh poetry

References

Kenneth Jackson, Tradition in Early Irish Prophecy, Man, Vol. 34, (May 1934), pp. 67–70.

External links

Neo-Druidic Sites
Awen – "The Holy Spirit of Druidry" British Druid Order site
A Short History of the Awen The Druid Network site

Medieval Welsh literature
Welsh mythology
Welsh poetry
Welsh-language literature
Neo-druidism
Neo-druidism in Britain